Dicranocarpus is a genus of flowering plants in the daisy family.

There is only one known species, Dicranocarpus parviflorus, native to Mexico (Coahuila, Durango, Nuevo León, Zacatecas, San Luis Potosí) and the United States (New Mexico, western Texas).

References

Monotypic Asteraceae genera
Flora of North America
Coreopsideae